The cave swiftlet or linchi swiftlet (Collocalia linchi) is a species of swift in the family Apodidae. It is found on the Indonesia islands of Sumatra, Java and Bali. It is a woodland species and nests in caves.  The Bornean swiftlet was considered a subspecies, but is now usually considered distinct.

Taxonomy
The cave swiftlet was described by the naturalists Thomas Horsfield and Frederic Moore in 1854 under the present binomial name Collocalia linchi.  The specific epithet linchi is the Javanese word for a swiftlet.

There are four recognised subspecies: 
 C. l. dedii Somadikarta, 1986 - Bali and Lombok
 C. l. linchi Horsfield & Moore, F, 1854 - Bawean and Java
 C. l. ripleyi Somadikarta, S, 1986 - Barisan Mountains, Sumatra
 C. l. dodgei Richmond, 1905 - Mt Kinabalu (Sabah), in N Borneo.

Description
This bird is shiny blackish-brown above with a greenish gloss, including its rump; sometimes looks black and hooded. Chest black; belly to flanks pale grey with fine black speckles at margins. Wing tips are rounded; underwing is black. Tail black, rounded with shallow notch but lacking the white specks found in the very similar glossy swiftlet (Collocalia esculenta). A distinguishing feature between the two species is that the glossy swiftlet has a tuft of feathers on its hind toe but the cave swiftlet has a naked toe. The call is a high-pitched "cheer-cheer".

Distribution and habitat
The cave swiftlet is native to Malaysia and Indonesia. It is found in the Sundaic region, in Java, Madura Island, Bawean, Kangean Island, Nusa Penida, Bali and Lombok, parts of Sumatra, and the western slopes of Mount Kinabalu on Sabah, Borneo. Evidence of it occurring in Malaysia rests on a single specimen in the British Museum labelled "Molacca". Its natural habitat is lowland and upland forest and open woodland.

Behaviour
The cave swiftlet is highly gregarious and flies with all the other species of swift that are sympatric with it. It often circles and flies through the branches of trees emerging through the canopy such as fruiting figs. It breeds in the lighter parts of caves, building a nest of stringy vegetation and cementing the materials to the rock with saliva. Two white, somewhat elongated eggs are laid.

Status
The cave swiftlet has a very wide range and is common in Java and the nearby islands. It has no particular threats and the IUCN has listed it as being of "Least Concern". Although the overall population may be declining slightly, this is not believed to be at such a rate as would justify listing it in a more threatened category.

References

Further reading

cave swiftlet
Birds of Sumatra
Birds of Java
Birds of Bali
Birds of Lombok
cave swiftlet
Taxonomy articles created by Polbot